Hollowiella rama is a moth in the family Cossidae. It was described by Yakovlev in 2006. It is found in northern Thailand.

The length of the forewings is about 12 mm.

Etymology
The species name refers to Rama, a hero of the ancient Indian epic Ramayana.

References

Natural History Museum Lepidoptera generic names catalog

Cossinae
Moths described in 2006
Moths of Asia